Angel Guardian Home can refer to more than one institution:

Angel Guardian Home (Brooklyn), an orphanage in Brooklyn, New York
Angel Guardian Home (Chicago), an orphanage in Chicago, Illinois